Ivan Guidea (born 12 May 1988) is a Romanian freestyle wrestler. He competed in the men's freestyle 57 kg event at the 2016 Summer Olympics, in which he was eliminated in the quarterfinals by Vladimir Dubov.

References

External links 
 

1988 births
Living people
Romanian male sport wrestlers
Olympic wrestlers of Romania
Wrestlers at the 2016 Summer Olympics